Owen Wynne (1687 – 1 June 1756) was an Irish Member of Parliament. He sat in the House of Commons of Ireland from 1713 to 1756.

He was an MP for Sligo Borough from 1713 until 1756.

References
 

1687 births
1756 deaths
Members of the Parliament of Ireland (pre-1801) for County Sligo constituencies
Irish MPs 1713–1714
Irish MPs 1715–1727
Irish MPs 1727–1760